Alma Pedersen (born 6 July 2005) is a Danish rhythmic gymnast. She represents her country in international competitions.

Personal life 
Pedersen took up rhythmic gymnastics at age 4, as of 2022 she trains 14 hours a week. Her idols are Russian rhythmic gymnasts Yana Kudryavtseva, Dina Averina and Arina Averina. Outside the gym Alma’s hobbies are spending time with friends, playing with her dog, using her IPad.  She and her Danish teammate Isabella Schultz won the Taastrup Trophy at the 2022 Taastrup Sports Club [TIK] Awards for their performances at the previous year's Nordic championships.

Career 
In 2019 Alma was the Danish representative at the 1st Junior Rhythmic Gymnastics Championships in Moscow, she was 58th with rope, 45th with ball, 37th with clubs and 53rd with ribbon.

In 2022 she made her senior international debut at the World Championships in Sofia where she finished 77th in the All-Around, 79th with hoop, 61st with ball, 79th with clubs and 78th with ribbon.

References 

2005 births
Living people
Danish rhythmic gymnasts
People from Egedal Municipality